BSBA may refer to:

 Bachelor of Science in Business Administration, academic degree
 British Sun Bathers Association, national federation of clubs
 British Sovereign Base Areas of Akrotiri and Dhekelia